Pančić is a surname. Notable people with the surname include:

 Elvira Pančić (born 1980), Serbian sprinter
 Josif Pančić (1814–1888), Serbian botanist
 Zoran Pančić (born 1953), Serbian rower

Serbian surnames